A Sierra cup (originally called a Sierra Club Cup) is a cup used for camping or Backpacking. Sierra cups are wider at the top than bottom, allowing for stacking. They typically have a fixed wire handle that is formed into a hook for attaching the cup to a belt. Some products, which use the name "sierra cup," have straight handles or handles that can fold away or be removed to save storage space. The cup is normally made of stainless steel, although other materials such as aluminum, titanium, and plastic have also been used. 

While metal sierra cups may be used for cooking food or purifying water, they were not designed for this use and do it poorly. The narrow base makes a sierra cup easier to tip over. The broad rim creates more surface area for water to evaporate, thus increasing time to boil water in it. The cup generally becomes scalding hot when heating water and cannot be drunk from directly until it has cooled down.

Sierra cups are typically small containers, holding about 10 oz. Sierra cups do have advantages: they are inexpensive and stack easily. Their handles and wide tops make them well suited for dispensing food out of a group pot, as well as a personal bowl/plate. 

Sierra cups have been in use since the early part of the 20th century, perhaps as early as 1905. A 1940 Sierra Club Bulletin article has pictures of sierra cup use in the wilderness dated as early as 1931.

References

External links
 Nancy Newhall, Tioga Mine, California - A photo of Nancy Newhall with a Sierra Club cup hooked in her belt, by Ansel Adams

Camping equipment